Since its return to democracy in 1990, Chile has been an active participant in the regional and international arena. Chile assumed a two-year non-permanent position on the UN Security Council in January 2003 and was re-elected to the council in October 2013. It is also an active member of the UN family of agencies, serving as a member of the Commission on Human Rights and participating in UN peacekeeping activities. Chile hosted the second Summit of the Americas in 1998, was the chair of the Rio Group in 2001, hosted the Defense Ministerial of the Americas in 2002, and the APEC summit and related meetings in 2004. In 2005 it hosted the Community of Democracies ministerial conference. It is an associate member of Mercosur and a full member of APEC. The OECD agreed to invite Chile to be among four countries to open discussions in becoming an official member. Chile has been an important actor on international economic issues and hemispheric free trade. The Chilean government has diplomatic relations with most countries.

Diplomatic relations

Chile does not currently maintain diplomatic relations with Benin, Bhutan, Bolivia, Burundi, the Central African Republic, Chad, the Comoros, Djibouti, Eritrea, the Gambia, Guinea-Bissau, Niger, Sierra Leone, Somalia, Togo, Taiwan, or Yemen. Regarding Western Sahara, Chile has sent contradictory comments. Chile's Senate speaker Sergio Romero has said that Chile does not recognize Western Sahara's independence, but Chile's Ministry of Foreign Relations website includes Western Sahara as an independent country with which Chile has no diplomatic relations.

Africa

Americas

Asia

Europe

Oceania

See also
 List of diplomatic missions in Chile
 List of diplomatic missions of Chile
 Visa requirements for Chilean citizens

References

Further reading
 Rodríguez Elizondo, José: Chile-Perú. El siglo que vivimos en peligro. La Tercera-Mondadori, Santiago, 2004

External links

 Ministry of Foreign Relations